Kunwara Badan is a 1973 Bollywood drama film directed by Vimal Tiwari. Playback was sung by Asha Bhosle, Lata Mangeshkar. Music was composed by Ghanashyam & songs were penned by Rajendra Krishan.

Cast
Madhu Chanda 
Paintal
Rakesh Pandey
Surendra
Suresh Chatwal

Songs
"Kal Ki Na Soch" - Asha Bhosle
"Haatho Me Mehndi Rachai Jayegi" - Asha Bhosle
"Apni Khushi Se Apna Hi Dil Todhna Pada" - Lata Mangeshkar
"Kuchh Bhuli Huyi Yaade" - Kishore Kumar

External links
 https://www.imdb.com/title/tt0269456/

1973 films
1970s Hindi-language films
1973 drama films